Vivir a Destiempo (literally: Living Untimely; official release: Timeless Love) is a Mexican telenovela produced by Fides Velasco and Jacky Castro for Azteca. It stars Edith González and Ramiro Fumazoni as the protagonists alongside Humberto Zurita, Andrea Noli and Wendy de los Cobos as the main villains. The original story and screenplay is written by Eric Vonn. From February 25 to September 20, 2013, Azteca 13 broadcast Vivir a Destiempo, replacing Los Rey.

Production
Eric Vonn has begun writing "A Contratiempo" in December 2012. Due to "A Contratiempo" being registered already by another producer, he changed the title of this telenovela to "Contracorriente". The telenovela changed the title again to "Vivir a Destiempo" because of already registered one by another producer.
First promotional aired on Azteca Trece on January 29.
Aura Cristina Geithner was initially confirmed for the character "Amparo" but was eventually replaced by Wendy de los Cobos.
Filming begun on February 7, 2013. The most of the exterior shots are filmed in Historic center of Mexico City, in Colonia Roma and Colonia Condesa neighborhoods and on Xochimilco Light Rail stations.
As the novela has lot of high tone content, Edith González uses double for sex scenes, as she has been doing in all novelas after she gave birth.
Due to great success, Azteca's headquarters asked Eric Vonn to extend telenovela from planned 120 episodes to 150. As of June 5, 2013, 100 episodes of screenplay are ready.
As of July 16, Eric Vonn has only 9 episodes of screenplay to write till the end.
Screenplay of last episode, number 150 was delivered from Eric Vonn to production team on 19 July.

Opening sequence
Javier "Fox" Patron directed the opening sequence of the series with Alexa camera using cinematographic techniques. On January 31, some parts of opening sequence were filmed. It resumed on February 7. The filming locations are Corredor Madero, Eje vial Lázaro Cárdenas (Bellas Artes, Torre Latinoamericana), Parque Hundido, Xochimilco Light Rail and San Ángel.

Theme song
Aranza, best known as the singer of Dime, the theme song to Mirada de Mujer, sang the opening theme of the series. The song was written and produced by Jorge Avendaño Lührs, who wrote the theme song to 1993's Corazón Salvaje starring Edith González. In the opening sequence, the second verse is sung in a higher note.

On August 1, Azteca Musica launched the album "Vivir a Destiempo" featuring the theme songs and some popular songs by Aranza.

Autograph session
The first autograph session was held on April 19 in Mexico City. It is expected to be held in various cities in the United States.

Synopsis
Paula Duarte and Alejandro Monroy were happily engaged in their youth. They ended the relationship when Alejandro left to study abroad, forced by his father.  His father did not approve of Paula as she did not seem apropiate for him due to her middle-class background. Paula's father, a manic-depressive man, commits suicide. She, her mother and sister are forced to cope alone. Looking for a way to forget Alejandro and the death of her father,  Paula begins dating Rogelio Bermúdez. He's a handsome, funny and experienced man, they soon start a relationship and become pregnant. They marry and have two children: Daniel and Tania.  Alejandro later in life marries Amparo Ávalos, a beautiful but promiscuous and capricious woman. They have a son, Eduardo. Over the years, Alejandro divorces his wife, sick of her high maintenance.

Paula and Alejandro meet again many years later, when their children start a relationship upon meeting in university. Over the years her happy relationship with her husband turns sour as she can not forget her past love Alejandro. Rogelio, due to this has become a misogynist and domineering man, with whom she was deeply unhappy. Love struggles to break through again between Paula and Alejandro, but her still intact marriage and children keep them separated.

The story chronicles the lives of all the characters who seem to be immersed in between conflict, love, and ambition. Paula discovers that Rogelio, her husband is cheating with someone she trusts blindly and begins working to feel some independence after her friend offers her a job at her retailor office. Meanwhile, Alejandro continues to pursue her despite her marriage and the idea of being with him stops Paula from working at her marriage.  She decides to call of  their marriage and give herself a chance to be happy with Alejandro. However, the things prove to become difficult and life stops them at every turn.

Vivir a Destiempo shows the struggle of three middle-class families and two upper class ones to get ahead in a world in crisis. The struggle of parents to rescue their children and show them the right path. The struggle of young people to overcome their problems and define who they are and where they go. Adults and young people in search of their own identity. Love, hate, passion. Sarcasm, black humor, sincere affection, frustrations and great satisfaction. Crude and violent events, tender and emotional stories that lead us to laughter and tears.

Cast

References

Mexican telenovelas
2013 Mexican television series debuts
2013 Mexican television series endings
2013 telenovelas
TV Azteca telenovelas
Spanish-language telenovelas